The 1965 George Washington Colonials football team was an American football team that represented George Washington University as part of the Southern Conference during the 1965 NCAA University Division football season. In its fifth season under head coach Jim Camp, the team compiled a 5–5 record (4–3 in the SoCon).

Schedule

References

George Washington
George Washington Colonials football seasons
George Washington Colonials football